Götz station is a railway station in the village of Götz, in the municipality of Groß Kreutz, located in the Potsdam-Mittelmark district in Brandenburg, Germany.

References

Railway stations in Brandenburg
Buildings and structures in Potsdam-Mittelmark